Abel Tasman (1603–1659) was a Dutch explorer.

Abel Tasman may also refer to:
 Abel Tasman (horse) (born 2014), American thoroughbred racehorse
 Abel Tasman National Park, a national park in the North end of the South Island, New Zealand
 MS Theofilos or Abel Tasman, a ferry
 FV Margiris or Abel Tasman, a trawling vessel
 Abel Tasman, a passenger aircraft that crashed as flight Trans Australia Airlines Flight 538 in 1960